Mokshansky District is an administrative and municipal district (raion), one of the twenty-seven in Penza Oblast, Russia. It is located in the north of the oblast. Its administrative center is the urban locality (a work settlement) of Mokshan. Population: 28,033 (2010 Census);  The population of Mokshan accounts for 41.4% of the district's total population.

References

Notes

Sources

 
Districts of Penza Oblast